Pain Serest (also Romanized as Pā’īn Serest; also known as Pā’īn Sar Rost) is a village in Gatab-e Shomali Rural District, Gatab District, Babol County, Mazandaran Province, Iran. At the 2006 census, its population was 366, in 87 families.

References 

Populated places in Babol County